Wintertime is a 1943 Twentieth Century-Fox musical film directed by John Brahm and starring Sonja Henie and Cesar Romero. It also features Woody Herman and His Orchestra.

Plot
Norwegian millionaire Ostgaard (S.Z. Sakall) and his niece Nora (Sonja Henie) believe they will be staying at a posh resort in Canada, but it turns out owner Skip Hutton (Jack Oakie) and partner Freddy Austin (Cornel Wilde) are in debt and barely holding off foreclosure.

Nora schemes to get her uncle to invest in hotel improvements. She also falls for Freddy, although he's busy spending time with magazine photographer Marion Daly (Helene Reynolds), trying to gain publicity for the resort.

When more money is needed, Nora is offered a chance to skate in New York in a revue. But due to a legal technicality, she cannot enter the United States unless she is married to an American citizen, so handsome Brad Barton (Cesar Romero) gladly volunteers.

Cast
 Sonja Henie as Nora Ostgaard
 Jack Oakie as Skip Hutton
 Cesar Romero as Brad Barton
 Carole Landis as  Flossie
 S. Z. Sakall as Uncle Ostgaard
 Cornel Wilde as Freddy Austin
 Woody Herman and His Orchestra as Themselves
 Helene Reynolds as Marian
 Don Douglas as Jay Rogers
 Geary Steffen as Jimmy, Sonja's Skating Partner

Production
In December 1941 Fox announced that Felix Jackson was writing Quota Girl as a vehicle for Sonja Henie which was meant to be made before Iceland. It was about a Norwegian girl who wants to emigrate to the US. The intention was to film it after Henie's appearance at Madison Square Garden in January. Filming was pushed back. In July Fox announced it would be made in October with H Humbertson directing, in color from a script by Francis Wallace. In August Arthur Kober was signed to write the script. In September Fox announced that filming would start in January.

In October Woody Herman and His Orchestra were signed to appear in the film, replacing Glenn Miller who had joined the Army.

In November Cornel Wilde was cast as Henie's leading man.

In January 1943,the film was retitled Wintertime. William Goetz, who was running 20th Century Fox in the absence of Darryl F. Zanuck, announced the film would be made as part of a 13-picture slate.

Cornel Wilde was cast in February 1943. The following month Carole Landis joined the cast. Filming started 8 March.

Songs
 "I Like It Here" ... (performed by Cesar Romero and Carole Landis)
 "Jingle Bells" ... (performed by Woody Herman and His Orchestra)
 "Wintertime" ... (performed by Woody Herman and His Orchestra)
 "We Always Get Our Girl" ... (performed by Woody Herman and His Orchestra)
 "Dancing in the Dawn" ... (performed by Woody Herman and His Orchestra)
 "Later Tonight" ... (performed by Woody Herman and His Orchestra)

Reception
The New York Times said the film "not only lacks originality. It lacks humor, verve and color as well." Filmink called it "good fun" with "great work" from Landis and Romero.

References

External links
 
 
 
 
Wintertime at Letterbox DVD
Wintertime at BFI

1943 films
20th Century Fox films
Films directed by John Brahm
Figure skating films
1943 musical films
American musical films
American black-and-white films
1940s English-language films
1940s American films